William Shakespeare (1564–1616) was an English playwright and poet.

Shakespeare  may also refer to:

Places
 Shakespeare, Ontario, Canada, a village and designated place
 Shakespeare, New Mexico, United States, a ghost town
 2985 Shakespeare, an asteroid
 Shakespeare (lunar crater), a crater on the Moon
 Shakespeare (Mercurian crater), a crater on Mercury
 Shakespeare quadrangle, a region on Mercury
 Shakespeare Cliff, near Dover, England, former location of Shakespeare Cliff Halt railway station

Arts and entertainment
 Shakespeare (album), a 2010 album by Anthony Jeselnik
 Shakespeare: The Animated Tales, an animated television series
 Shakespeare, a meerkat on Meerkat Manor
 "Shakespeare", a song by Akala
 Kent Shakespeare, a DC Comics hero
 Shakespeare (Anthony Burgess), a biographical and critical study of William Shakespeare by Burgess

Other uses
 Shakespeare (surname)
 HMS Shakespeare, a list of ships
 HMS Shakespeare (1917),  a Thornycroft type destroyer leader launched in 1917
 HMS Shakespeare (P221),  an S-class submarine launched in 1941
 Shakespeare baronets, a title in the Baronetage of the United Kingdom
 Shakespeare Bridge, Los Angeles, California
 Shakespeare Fishing Tackle
 Shakespeare Institute, University of Birmingham, Stratford-upon-Avon, United Kingdom
 Shakespeare Line, an alternative name for the North Warwickshire Line, a railway line
 Shakespeare Programming Language
 William Hill (This Is Us), a fictional character nicknamed "Shakespeare"

See also
 Shakespeare and Company (disambiguation)
 Shakespeare by the Sea (disambiguation)
 Shakespeare Company (disambiguation)
 Shakespeare Garden (disambiguation)
 Shakespeare Songs (disambiguation)
 Shakespeare Theatre (disambiguation)
 Shakespeare's Sister (disambiguation)

Related
 Shakespear (disambiguation)
 William Shakespeare (disambiguation)
 

br:Shakespeare